Vicamentia is a genus of moths belonging to the subfamily Olethreutinae of the family Tortricidae. It contains only one species, Vicamentia vietnamica, which is found in Vietnam.

The wingspan is 12 mm. The ground colour of the forewings is cream, densely strigulate and
reticulate brownish. The markings are rudimentary, brown and consist of a diffuse basal blotch, the costal part of the median fascia and an oblique line from. The hindwings are pale brownish, but creamier basally.

Etymology
The name of the genus is an anagram of the name of the type-species.

See also
List of Tortricidae genera

References

Enarmoniini
Monotypic moth genera
Moths of Asia